Darius Johnson (born February 22, 1991) is a former American football wide receiver. He played college football for Southern Methodist University. Johnson was named his team's MVP in the 2010 edition of the Armed Forces Bowl. He was signed by the Atlanta Falcons as an undrafted free agent in 2013.  He appeared in 10 games for the Falcons during the 2013 NFL season; he had 22 receptions for 210 yards and one touchdown. In May 2014, Johnson was arrested for DUI, and was subsequently released by the Falcons.

References

External links
Atlanta Falcons bio
SMU Mustangs bio 

1991 births
Living people
People from Missouri City, Texas
Players of American football from Texas
American football wide receivers
SMU Mustangs football players
Atlanta Falcons players
Sportspeople from Harris County, Texas